Classic is the second compilation and sixth album overall by hip hop duo Eric B. & Rakim, one of the titles of the European version of Universal Music Group’s Millennium Masters series. Despite being an Eric B. & Rakim album, the back cover featured Eric B. with Chuck D. because of an editing error.

Track listing
"Follow the Leader" (Eric B., Steve Griffin, Rakim) - 5:35 
"Lyrics of Fury" (B., Griffin, Rakim) - 4:13 
"Microphone Fiend" (B., Griffin, Rakim) - 5:15 
"Let the Rhythm Hit 'Em" (B., Griffin, Rakim) - 5:25 
"In the Ghetto" (B., Griffin, Rakim) - 5:27 
"The Punisher" (B., Griffin, Rakim) - 4:08 
"Know the Ledge" (Rakim) - 4:00 
"I Know You Got Soul" (B., Charles Bobbit, James Brown, Bobby Byrd, Rakim) - 4:47 
"Eric B. Is President" (B., Rakim) - 6:20 
"I Ain't No Joke" (B., Rakim) - 3:55 
"Paid in Full" (B., Rakim) - 3:49 
"It's Been a Long Time" (B., Bobbit, Brown, Byrd, DJ Premier, Rakim) - 3:58 
"Real Shit" (Ron Lawrence, Padilla, Rakim) - 4:21 
"Flow Forever" (Davis, Clark Kent, Rakim) - 4:13 
"I Know" (Hinds, Benny Latimore, Rakim, Randolph) - 4:09

Personnel 

Eric B. – Producer
DJ Premier – Producer, Mixing
Richard Ganter – Compilation
Robert Hill – Producer
Clark Kent – Producer, Mixing
Ron "Amen-Ra" Lawrence – Producer
Rakim – Producer
TR Love – Producer
Patrick Adams - Engineer, Mixing

References

Eric B. & Rakim albums
Albums produced by Eric B.
2003 compilation albums